Phillip John Edman (born 24 August 1970) is an Australian politician.

Born in Tamworth, New South Wales, Edman arrived in Western Australia in 1976. He owned a cabinet making business before entering politics. After unsuccessfully contesting the House of Representatives seat of Brand for the Liberal Party in the 2004 and 2007 federal elections, he was elected to the Western Australian Legislative Council for South Metropolitan in 2008. His term commenced on 22 May 2009.

Political life

Rockingham City Council 
Edman served as a Councillor with the City of Rockingham from 2005 until 2009, for the ward of Safety Bay.

Legislative Council of Western Australia 
Edman was elected to the 38th Parliament in the Western Australian Legislative Council for the South Metropolitan Region in 2008. His term commenced on 22 May 2009.

He subsequently won re-election in 2013 for the South Metropolitan Region, and was made Government Whip in the Legislative Council on 23 March 2013.

Misconduct finding
In December 2019, in an interim report, the WA Corruption and Crime Commission (CCC) found that Edman had misappropriated his taxpayer-funded electoral allowance, using it for private expenditure on clothing and other items, paying speeding fines, gambling, and running a private yacht, as well as facilitating intimate relationships with various women. WA Opposition Leader Liza Harvey expressed her disgust at Edman's behaviour, and asked that the process of expelling him from the Liberal Party be commenced. It was reported that Edman had already resigned.

The CCC had earlier seized a laptop and two hard drives owned by Edman, which had been believed to contain incriminating evidence due to information Edman revealed while his phone was tapped. However, they were forced to return the items as they were subject to parliamentary privilege. The WA Government demanded that the laptop be returned to the CCC for investigation upon the release of the December report.

References

1970 births
Living people
Liberal Party of Australia members of the Parliament of Western Australia
Members of the Western Australian Legislative Council
21st-century Australian politicians
Western Australian local councillors